Sunset Lake is a census-designated place (CDP) in Cumberland County, New Jersey, United States. It is in the northern part of the county, in the southwest corner of Upper Deerfield Township. It is bordered to the south by the city of Bridgeton, the county seat. It is bordered to the east by Laurel Heights, to the north by Silver Lake, and to the west by Sunset Lake, an impoundment on the Cohansey River. Across the lake is Hopewell Township.

Sunset Lake was first listed as a CDP prior to the 2020 census.

Demographics

References 

Census-designated places in Cumberland County, New Jersey
Census-designated places in New Jersey
Upper Deerfield Township, New Jersey